Sonoma–Marin Area Rail Transit (SMART) is a rail line and bicycle-pedestrian pathway project in Sonoma and Marin counties of the U.S. state of California. When completed, the entire system will serve a  corridor between Cloverdale in northern Sonoma County and Larkspur Landing in Marin County.

The first phase of the system, a  segment between Northern Santa Rosa and downtown San Rafael, opened to public preview and excursion services (as far south as Marin County Civic Center) on June 29, 2017. Regular service began on August 25, 2017, after the Federal Railroad Administration (FRA) gave the final approval for the positive train control (PTC) system. The southern  of the line was completed to Larkspur with service commencing on December 14, 2019.

History

Background and formation 
The last passenger rail service along the Northwestern Pacific Railroad south of Willits was discontinued in 1958 as automobile travel along U.S. Route 101 in California increased in popularity.

The SMART District was established by state legislation in 2002. Previously disused station buildings were repaired in anticipation of reestablished rail service in Healdsburg and Windsor, and Cloverdale's depot was constructed in 1998.

Environmental impact report 
Mitigation of environmental impacts was studied and summarized in a report issued in June 2006. The recommended remedies, which were certified without challenge, included silencing of some train horns in quiet zones and replacement of certain wetland ditches.

Funding 
The project is funded by federal, state, regional and local allocations including bridge tolls, dedicated sales tax revenues, and fares. The capital cost of track rehabilitation for the full 70-mile line, signals, railcars, etc. was estimated to be about $450 million in 2008 ($ adjusted for inflation). By 2019, development of the line from Airport Boulevard in Santa Rosa to the San Rafael Transit Center totaled $448 million and the estimated cost to complete the legislated system had increased to $944 million.

In November 2006, Measure R, a proposal for funding though an increase in sales taxes, received a combined 65.3% "yes" vote in the two-county District, with 70.1% in favor in Sonoma County and 57.5% in favor in Marin County. Because it lacked the 2/3 supermajority needed for passage, that measure failed.

Measure Q, similar to Measure R, was approved on November 4, 2008. It received a combined vote of 69.5% in the two counties (73.5% approval in Sonoma County and 62.6% in Marin County). It provides funding for the project through a quarter-cent sales tax in both counties set to expire in 2029. This funding was initially thought sufficient to bring the line to completion by 2014. However, the economic downturn reduced the tax base, resulting in a plan to build the project in phases. The tax was expected to generate $890 million over its lifetime; the first decade brought in $289 million, well short of estimates.

In March 2020, SMART went back to the voters with Measure I to extend the sales tax, not scheduled to expire until 2029, for an additional thirty years; the measure ultimately failed.

Bond issues 
The SMART Board authorized the sale of bonds in late 2011; proceeds were placed into an escrow account until the effort to repeal the sales tax was resolved.

In May 2012, SMART issued nearly $200 million in bonds to fund construction. The bonds will be paid off with the Measure Q quarter-cent sales tax revenue.

Initial operating segment track rehabilitation 
In January 2012, SMART completed final negotiations to start rebuilding the  Initial Operating Segment (IOS) between Airport Blvd Santa Rosa and the Civic Center Station in San Rafael at a cost less than originally budgeted. The segment was completed jointly by Stacy & Witbeck and  Herzog Contracting Corp. In 2012, SMART announced that it was adding two stations to the Initial Operation Segment: in north Santa Rosa, near Coddingtown, and in Novato at Atherton Avenue.

The Puerto Suello Hill Tunnel in San Rafael was rehabilitated for service and the 111-year old fixed span Haystack Bridge was replaced with a newer movable bascule bridge. Businesses may connect a switch and spur to the line by purchasing the equipment for about $300,000.

The first phase of construction does not include the complete parallel pedestrian and bicycle path.

Delayed start of service 
Scheduled passenger service, already delayed from an originally estimated 2014, had long been expected for late 2016. This resulted from lack of tax revenues due to the economic downturn, which also led to the project opening in phases.

As late 2016 approached, the agency further delayed opening the IOS between Northern Santa Rosa and Downtown San Rafael until "late spring 2017." A crankshaft failure on a diesel engine used in the near-identical Nippon Sharyo diesel multiple unit trains operating in Toronto necessitated all of SMART's cars to be recalled for crank replacements, according to SMART management. The agency additionally had been experiencing problems with warning systems at some grade crossings, and had not fully completed its approval process with the Federal Railroad Administration. The 2017 California floods caused damage to the Puerto Suello Hill Tunnel, further delaying testing of the line.

Preview service and excursion trips timed with the Marin County Fair began on June 29, 2017, with free fares as far south as Marin Civic Center. Full service commenced on August 25, 2017.

Larkspur segment 

The cost to San Rafael of the Andersen Drive crossing of the Larkspur to San Rafael segment is significant. The street was extended by San Rafael in the mid-1990s to cross the tracks on a "temporary road". In July 1997, the California Public Utilities Commission informed the city that by the time SMART planned to operate on the section, the city had to build and pay for restoring the crossing. The estimated cost for that was $6 million in 2012.

In 2010, the agency received a federal earmark of $2.5 million for technical, environmental and engineering design on the segment. The revamping was done at a cost of $28 million, paid equally by Marin County and SMART. The tunnel is used both for the rail right of way between Larkspur and San Rafael and by bicycles and pedestrians.

In May 2013, the SMART board approved a resolution designating the San Rafael to Larkspur link as its "preferred alternative". The agency submitted a letter to the Federal Transit Administration, and on September 24, 2013, SMART was accepted into its "Small Starts" program. The FY2016 Federal Budget included the funds to construct the Larkspur Extension under the Small Starts Program. Construction contracts were awarded to a joint venture of Stacy and Witbeck and Herzog Contracting Corporation at a cost of $36.3 million, and work commenced by late 2017 with an expected opening of late 2019. In April 2018, SMART was awarded a $22.5 million federal grant for the extension. Final costs for the extension are estimated to total $55.4 million. Train control and crossing system testing along the extension began in August 2019 and was completed by the end of October, whereupon driver training began. Revenue service commenced on December 14, 2019.

Construction of the Novato Downtown station began significantly after work began on the initial operating segment. It was partially constructed by the system's opening, but the station opened with the Larkspur extension.

2019 service disruptions 
Service was cancelled on October 28 and 29, 2019 due to preemptive power shutoffs affecting crossings throughout the system. Partial service as far north as Downtown Santa Rosa was established on October 30, and the following day full service was restored with free rides offered through November 6 to give transportation options to those affected by the Kincade Fire. According to Farhad Mansourian, the service disruptions had not impacted testing of the Larkspur extension and Downtown Novato station.

Service gaps existed during the weekends of November 2019 between Petaluma to Novato–Hamilton as testing for the Downtown Novato station commenced. A bus bridge was provided from both stations with a transfer at San Marin.

2020–22 operational changes 
SMART initiated a schedule with 8 weekday round trips and no weekend service amid the COVID-19 pandemic. The agency planned to only resume 13 round trips on weekdays in an effort to lower costs with reduced ridership and an uncertain tax base. In May 2021, service increased to 13 weekday round trips and 6 Saturday round trips. In September 2021, after receiving $3.2 million in federal stimulus funds, SMART indicated it would restore pre-pandemic schedules in 2022.

In May 2020, the agency acquired control of freight operations along the line from the Northwestern Pacific Railroad. The $4 million  purchase of rolling stock, track rights, and other properties was funded by the state. Sunday service resumed on May 1, 2022.

North of Santa Rosa 
By 2018, the  extension was expected to cost $55 million: $20 million from Road Repair and Accountability Act funds, $30 million in Regional Measure 3 funds, and a $5 million federal grant. By November 2019, the cost estimate had increased to $65 million with construction starting in 2020.

The route north of Santa Rosa to Cloverdale was intended to open with the initial segment, but lack of funding delayed this segment. By May 2019, the estimated cost to complete the system to Cloverdale and Healdsburg was $364 million. A letter to the city of Healdsburg in 2020 estimated the cost of reconstructing the Russian River bridge, building a new station, and rehabilitating the line at $32 million. The 2018 California State Rail Plan based its projections on service to Cloverdale station by 2027.

Work on the extension to Windsor, funded by a bridge toll, was temporarily suspended in 2021. The lawsuit was dismissed in January 2023, freeing up $40 million for SMART, and the agency received a $34 million state grant in February. At that time, SMART intended to wait until June 2023 to determine whether it would have sufficient funding to combine a further extension to Healdsburg with the completion of the Windsor extension. If the full $113 million in additional grants is received, Windsor service would begin in 2025 or 2026, and Healdsburg service by 2027.

Expansion 
Several services have been envisioned to expand the system. Additional infill stations serving Santa Rosa or Fulton may be added in the future.

In 2019, SMART released a study on the possibility of extending service along SMART (formerly NWP) owned and operated freight tracks between Ignacio and Schellville (near Sonoma), into Napa or Solano counties. Funding for the study was provided by the state in response to chronic flooding along the State Route 37 corridor. Not being member counties of the Sonoma–Marin Area Rail Transit District, a new funding mechanism would have to be established before service commenced. This line would allow the train to connect with the passenger ferry in Vallejo or the Amtrak station in Suisun City. , planners expect this rail link to be reactivated for service after 2040, and the 2019 study expected construction time between four and six years. Estimated at $1 billion, work on this link would not begin until after the initial 70-mile system was operational.

Also proposed is extending SMART north beyond Cloverdale to Ukiah or the planned NWP terminus in Willits, where it would connect with the California Western Railroad and its tourist services. A proposal to expand service to the East Bay over a rebuilt Richmond–San Rafael Bridge was named a Finalist in the Transformative Projects Process of the Metropolitan Transportation Commission's Plan Bay Area 2050.

System details

Rail corridor and freight 

The SMART District provides passenger service on the historic Northwestern Pacific right-of-way, which roughly parallels US Highway 101 and is owned by the SMART District from Healdsburg to Larkspur. There are 24 bridges in the segment from San Rafael to Santa Rosa, as well as 63 at grade crossings (with the possibility of adding more). A positive train control system, as mandated by the FRA for passenger services with grade crossings, was implemented for the length of the service corridor for customer and pedestrian safety.

The Northwestern Pacific Railroad corridor is also used by North Coast Railroad Authority (NCRA) freight services. Freight operator NWP Co began to serve businesses along the SMART right-of-way between Lombard (at the Napa River) and Windsor in 2011. SMART absorbed the NWP operations in 2020.

In December 2014, rains washed away some of the train track beds near Petaluma at Ely Road. A photo of the spot in December showed the tracks hidden beneath feet of water. A spokesperson for SMART said that "Trains are not running yet, so this is something we will pay attention to." In 2021, the agency was awarded a grant to help fund improvements in freight infrastructure, including new sidings and repairing the bridge over the Petaluma River.

SMART acquired 88 miles of right-of-way from NCRA in March 2021, with operating rights transferred on July 26, 2021. NWP continued operating freight service under contract.

Stations 

Many of the station platforms are located near historic depots in city centers. Stations typically include a small shelter with a peaked roof and a bench for seating; they also feature light poles, signs, and garbage cans.

Original plans called for ten stations in the initial operating segment (IOS) with five more in a second phase. A further station was added in Novato's downtown district late in construction of the IOS, and did not open with the system's inauguration.

Rolling stock 

The SMART fleet consists of nine two-car Nippon Sharyo DMU trainsets. Each DMU car is powered by a Cummins QSK19-R diesel engine. The vehicles, designed specifically for SMART and another transit service, the Union Pearson Express in Toronto, Ontario, Canada, are slope-nosed and self-propelled by diesel engines that meet stringent "Tier 4" EPA requirements. For regular service, SMART runs DMUs in pairs or triplicate. Trains may be as long as station platforms provided there are cabs facing the outer ends. Each two-car train has room for over 300 passengers.

The diesel multiple unit trainsets were ordered from Sumitomo Corporation of America / Nippon Sharyo at a cost of $46.7 million, or $6.67 million for each two car set. They were delivered to Rochelle, Illinois, for assembling, and then sent to the Transportation Technology Center in Pueblo, Colorado, for testing. Under the contract, additional railcars may be ordered at a cost of $2.9 million per individual car. The first trainset arrived in Cotati, California, on April 7, 2015. The original order was for fourteen cars in seven two car trainsets, but on July 30, 2015, the state of California announced an $11 million grant to SMART to finance the purchase of three additional cars to be added to the fleet, allowing for three trainsets to be run with three cars, with an increase in capacity of 130 passengers over a two car trainset. In April 2016, SMART's general manager negotiated with CalSTA and Nippon Sharyo to adjust the order so SMART will receive two more full trainsets in place of the extra cars, bringing their fleet size to the required nine trainsets needed for service to Cloverdale. They will be painted in a McGlashan green livery.

A July 2016 fire aboard one of Toronto's Nippon Sharyo units revealed a design flaw in the engine's crankshaft that would result in premature wear; SMART decided to delay operations until the engines could be serviced to correct the problem. All trains were refurbished at SMART's rail center by April 2017. 

Four additional cars, numbered 115 through 118, were delivered to SMART in 2018. The four cars were damaged during shipping in a freight collision while en route to SMART. The agency did not accept the cars as delivered, and Nippon Sharyo dispatched a team to California to assess the damage and plan for repairs.

Bicycle and pedestrian pathway 
In the original sales tax expenditure plan, $90 million was allocated for a bike/pedestrian path along the line for recreation and to enhance connections between stations and the developing network of bicycle-pedestrian pathways. As a result of the Great Recession of 2008, SMART changed its plans for the construction of the bicycle-pedestrian pathway as well as the rail project. Current SMART pathway construction focuses on bridging gaps between existing bicycle-pedestrian pathways, providing access to stations and serving potential high-use areas. A number of segments are being constructed in partnership with local jurisdictions. For example, SMART has obtained a grant for pathway construction in Rohnert Park and is seeking grants to fund additional segments. As of February 2019,  was completed with the majority of funding coming from local jurisdictions.

Operations 

Trains operate 19 round trips on weekdays.

Fares 
The system operates with fare zones and a proof-of-payment system with the San Francisco Bay-area Clipper card serving as a payment method. Tickets may also be purchased using the SMART eTickets mobile app. There are five zones in the initial opening segment which will expand to seven when service to Cloverdale is established. Zone ticketing requires little infrastructure at the stations but can be expensive for passengers making a short trip that crosses a zone boundary.

Fares start at $1.50 for a ride within one zone, with an additional $1.50 added for entering each new zone. Once a daily fare of $15 is reached (the maximum round-trip fare), no additional fares will be assessed for further travel that day. Transfers from Santa Rosa CityBus, Sonoma County Transit, Petaluma Transit, and Golden Gate Transit will receive a $1.50 reduction in fare per transfer ($0.75 for discounted tickets). A specialty Discount Clipper card or the SMART phone app, can be used for discounted fares of up to 50% for children, senior citizens, low income, and persons with disabilities. The Discounted fare is $0.75 plus $0.75 per zone A monthly pass is also sold for $135 ($67.50 for eligible riders) which grants the bearer 31 days of unlimited travel from the date of first use. A Special Weekender Pass is offered on Saturdays for $10 ($5 for eligible riders) that offers unlimited rides for the day. Parking is $2 daily or $20 for a monthly pass at stations, with no overnight parking.

SMART train service was free of charge during the preview service period and the opening day of full service. After opening day, SMART fares were half price through Labor Day, September 4, 2017. Regular fares were charged beginning on September 5. The October 2017 Northern California wildfires and 2019 California wildfires prompted the agency to provide free limited service for evacuees.

Additional services 
Excursion trains may be run for special events, such as the Marin County Fair.

Until 2017, the Sonoma Raceway operated a race-day excursion service that used right-of-way owned by SMART, though not on the mainline tracks and using Amtrak equipment. A minimal platform had been constructed nearby.

Ridership 
Ridership in the second quarter of 2018 was 177,800, for a weekly average of 13,700. The highest single day ridership occurred on Saturday, August 18, 2018 when 4,735 trips were counted during a weekend of free rides.

Governance 

The Sonoma–Marin Area Rail Transit District is a special-purpose district consisting of Sonoma and Marin Counties. The Board of Directors represent the various cities and transit agencies served along the main line. The twelve members consist of:
Two members of the Sonoma County Board of Supervisors, each of whom shall also serve on the Board of Directors of the Sonoma County Transportation Authority, appointed by the Sonoma County Board of Supervisors.
Two members of the Marin County Board of Supervisors, appointed by the Marin County Board of Supervisors.
Three members, each of whom shall be a mayor or council member of a city or town within the County of Sonoma, appointed by the Sonoma County Mayors and Council Members Association or its successor, provided the following conditions are met:
At least two members are also city representatives for the Sonoma County Transportation Authority.
All of the members are from cities on the rail line in Sonoma County.
No city has more than one member.
The member of the City Council of the City of Novato who also serves on the Marin County Congestion Management Agency, appointed by the Marin County Congestion Management Agency or its successor.
The member of the City Council of the City of San Rafael who also serves on the Marin County Congestion Management Agency, appointed by the Marin County Congestion Management Agency or its successor.
One member, who shall be a mayor or council member of a city or town within the County of Marin and a member of the Marin County Congestion Management Agency, appointed by the Marin County Council of Mayors and Council Members or its successor.
Two members of the Golden Gate Bridge, Highway and Transportation District, neither of whom shall be a member of the Marin or Sonoma County Boards of Supervisors, appointed by the Golden Gate Bridge, Highway and Transportation District or its successor.

In January 2011, General Manager Lilian Hames, who had led the project for a decade, resigned amid ongoing concern about the project's financial challenges and the necessity to build it in phases. David Heath, the Chief Financial Officer, took over management duties until the appointment later that year of Farhad Mansourian as acting General Manager. In August 2011, Mansourian was appointed permanent General Manager, assuming both financial and general management responsibilities for the project.

For many years, Mansourian was Director of Public Works for Marin County, and his combined annual compensation from SMART ($346,000) and Marin County pension ($148,000) raised some questions initially.  SMART board members said that the threat of a SMART repeal effort made bringing a general manager from an out-of-state rail system to the San Francisco Bay Area even more costly. They concluded that Mansourian's demonstrated abilities during his temporary assignment coupled with his knowledge of California's permitting requirements and successful delivery of complex public works projects in Marin County made him the best candidate.

The official color of SMART is McGlashan green, after former Marin county supervisor Charles McGlashan, a SMART proponent who died suddenly of a heart attack in 2011.

See also 
 North Pacific Coast Railroad – a predecessor railroad of the NWP that served Marin and Sonoma counties with interurban routes from 1874 to 1902
 List of San Francisco Bay Area trains
 List of California railroads
 List of rail transit systems in the United States

References

External links 

 
SMART Train | Flickr

 
Public transportation in Marin County, California
Public transportation in Sonoma County, California
Larkspur, California
Novato, California
San Rafael, California
Santa Rosa, California
Bike paths in the San Francisco Bay Area
Rail trails in California
Trails in the San Francisco Bay Area
2002 establishments in California
2017 in rail transport
Railway lines opened in 2017
Standard gauge railways in the United States
California railroads
Projects established in 2008